Gala Day is a one-day festival held in many towns over the world.

One of the biggest is held in the city of Geelong, Victoria, Australia. The festival raises money for the Geelong Hospital, and was known for the street parade through central Geelong which featured local community groups, amusement rides in the main street, a sideshow alley, and showbag stalls.

History
The first Gala Day was held on Friday, 3 November 1916, at the height of World War I, to raise money for the Red Cross Society. Described by the Geelong Advertiser as "the biggest fete the city had ever seen, the most perfectly planned function, the gayest spectacle, and the highest in patriotic purpose", the first parade raised 5500 pounds - a staggering amount for the day.

After the success of the first festival, Gala Day was adopted as an annual event, the second festival being held on 2 November 1917. It was not until 1927 that the Geelong Hospital took over responsibility for running the festival. The festival was traditionally held on a Friday, and students at local schools were given a holiday.

From 2006, the festival was changed, being renamed the Gala Appeal "Family Fun Day" and moved to the first week of December. The festival is now held in Johnstone Park, and has been accused of being "watered down" from the old event by some.

In 2008, the event was again changed, with the Gala Day Parade and Family Fun Day moved to a Saturday. Schools, community groups and corporate groups can enter a float in the parade. The Family Fun Day returned to the city's spectacular waterfront at Steampacket Gardens, featuring market and food stalls, rides, show bags and roving performances from local artists, including renowned interpretive dance duo Barnes and Tommy, who received the 2015 GMHBA Encouragement Award for a spirited routine to John Farnham's "Two Strong Hearts."

Many cities that observe Gala Day in 2020 will go virtual on grounds of COVID-19 pandemic, as will 2021, especially in Geelong.

References

External links

Barwon Health Foundation

Recurring events established in 1916
Culture in Geelong
Tourist attractions in Geelong
Festivals in Victoria (Australia)